Edwin Herbert Samuel, 2nd Viscount Samuel  (11 September 1898 – 14 November 1978), was a British lord, also active in Mandatory Palestine and the State of Israel.

The son of Beatrice Franklin and Herbert Samuel – Palestine's first high commissioner – he was the father of Professor David Samuel and Dan Samuel.

Samuel was educated at Westminster School and Balliol College, Oxford.  In the spring of 1917 he joined the Royal Artillery and was posted to the Egyptian Expeditionary Force. He also served in the Jewish Legion. After the First World War he joined the Mandatory Government in Palestine, and was the last mandate-era director of the Palestine Broadcasting Service.

As a viscount, he served as a peer in the House of Lords. One of his significant acts was to have the law that forbade marriage between a woman and her brother-in-law repealed. His explicit intent was to allow a man to fulfil his responsibility under the Judaic Biblical law of levirate marriage, as described in the Book of Deuteronomy, whereby the brother of a man who dies childless must marry the widow.

Lord Samuel was the initiator of the Knesset Menorah project which eventually led to the huge bronze candelabrum presented by the British parliament to the State of Israel in 1956.

References

Further reading
Edwin Samuel: A Lifetime in Jerusalem. The Memoirs of the Second Viscount Samuel (Transaction Publishers, 1970).

External links 

 Edwin Samuel's personal archives on the Israel State Archives website
 Herbert Samuel and the British Mandate for Palestine: The Formative Years on the Israel State Archives website

1898 births
1978 deaths
British Jews
Edwin
British Army personnel of World War I
People educated at Westminster School, London
Royal Artillery officers
Companions of the Order of St Michael and St George
2